John Baker Jr. is the name of:

John A. Baker Jr. (1927–1994), U.S. diplomat
John Baker (defensive lineman, born 1935) (1935–2007), American defensive lineman in the National Football League 
John F. Baker Jr. (1945–2012),  U.S. Army Master Sergeant and Medal of Honor recipient

See also
John Baker (disambiguation)